Sade Sealy (born 18 November 1991) is a Barbadian athlete competing in the 400 and 800 metres. She represented her country in the 400 metres at the 2013 World Championships without advancing from the first round. After switching to the 800 metres she finished fourth at the 2019 Pan American Games in a new national record of 2:02.23.

International competitions

1Disqualified in the final

Personal bests
Outdoor
200 metres – 23.80 (+1.8 m/s, Des Moines 2013)
400 metres – 52.01 (Des Moines 2013)
800 metres – 2:02.23 (Lima 2019) NR
1500 metres – 4:25.61 (Bridgetown 2020) NR
400 metres hurdles – 1:01.07 (Charleston 2012)

Indoor
200 metres – 24.61 (Cedar Falls 2013)
400 metres – 54.14 (Cedar Falls 2013)
800 metres – 2:16.40 (Normal 2012)

References

1991 births
Living people
Barbadian female sprinters
Barbadian female middle-distance runners
World Athletics Championships athletes for Barbados
Pan American Games competitors for Barbados
Athletes (track and field) at the 2015 Pan American Games
Athletes (track and field) at the 2019 Pan American Games
Competitors at the 2018 Central American and Caribbean Games